Tries may refer to the plural form of:
Try (rugby)
 Try, a conversion (gridiron football)
Trie, a prefix tree in computer science